Jérôme Fenoglio (born 1965/1966) is a French journalist. He serves as the editorial director of Le Monde.

References

1960s births
20th-century French journalists
21st-century French journalists
French newspaper editors
Le Monde writers
Living people
Place of birth missing (living people)
Year of birth uncertain